Eli J. Mansour (born 1968) is a synagogue rabbi whose ongoing lectures and writings are circulated beyond his Brooklyn-located Edmond J Safra Synagogue location. Although he is a sephardic rabbi whose photos show him without a beard, he has a following within the Orthodox Ashkenazic community.

Within the synagogue Mansour "gives daily classes in mishnah, gemara, halachah, torah, neviim, and a variety of subjects relevant to the orthodox community," including a Daf Yomi.

Every issue of Community Magazine features a multi-page article authored by him.

Education
Following primary education under giudance of Hacham Hillel Haber SHLITA Rabbi Eli J. Mansour studied at Mercaz HaTorah in Israel and then, upon returning to the US, he learned at Yeshiva Ateret Torah (Brooklyn), and then Bet Midrash Gavoha in Lakewood.

Mansour then joined Keter Tzion Kollel, learning under the guidance of Rabbi Max Maslaton, receiving Smichah in 1998.

Lectures
Beyond those lectures given within his synagogue, Mansour participates in programs hosted elsewhere, including specialized women's programs. He also speaks at specialized outreach programs, and "is also a featured speaker on the Aish HaTorah website."

Works
 co-authored a Sephardic Passover Hagada published by Artscroll.
 Patah Eliyahu: The Daily Halacha, a printed version of approximately 400 Halachot and insights on every Parasha. (Artscroll)
 Living a Torah life: A Collection of Essays on Contemporary Jewish Issues

His lectures are carried on a phone-based service and are featured on seven websites.

References

1968 births
American Orthodox rabbis
Sephardi rabbis
Living people
20th-century American rabbis
21st-century American rabbis